Fifth Element is the second studio album by Polish Symphonic Power Metal band Pathfinder. It was released in Asia May 23, 2012 (This time through Avalon Sounds) and to the rest of the world May 26 (still through Sonic Attack), and included region-specific bonus tracks. On March 22, the band announced a poll that was to decide which of four original tracks off the upcoming album Fifth Element was to be released early as a taste of the new album. The song Elemental Power won and was made public through the band's YouTube channel on March 23. The album features 13 tracks and continues Pathfinder's tradition of symphonic power metal. On 2 December 2013 their album Fifth Element was "album of the month" according to the German website "HardHarderHeavy".

Track listing

 "Ventus Ignis Terra Aqua" - 2:05
 "Fifth Element" - 8:46
 "Ready to Die Between Stars" - 5:50
 "The Day When I Turn Back Time" - 6:20
 "Chronokinesis" - 5:31
 "March to The Darkest Horizon" - 7:52
 "Yin-Yang" - 4:03
 "Elemental Power" - 4:33
 "Ad Futuram Rei Memoriam" - 5:04
 "When The Sunrise Breaks The Darkness" - 6:19
 "Vita" - 1:34
 "Spartakus And The Sun Beneath The Sea (European Bonus Track)" - 4:36
 "If I Could Turn Back Time (Cher Cover) (Japanese Only Bonus Track)" - 4:56

Personnel
 Simon Kostro - Lead Vocals
 Karol Mania - Lead & Rhythm Guitars
 Krzysztof Gunsen Elzanowski - Rhythm & Lead Guitars
 Kacper Stachowiak - Drums
 Bartosz Ogrodowicz - Keyboards
 Arkadiusz E. Ruth - Bass

Guest musicians
 Agatha Lejba-Migdalskiej - Soprano

References

2012 albums
Pathfinder (band) albums